The American Immigration Lawyers Association (AILA), founded on October 14, 1946, is a voluntary bar association of over 15,000 attorneys and law professors who practice and teach immigration law. AILA member attorneys represent U.S. families seeking permanent residence for close family members, as well as U.S. businesses seeking talent from the global marketplace. AILA members also represent foreign students, entertainers, athletes, and asylum seekers, often on a pro bono basis. AILA is a nonpartisan, not-for-profit organization that provides continuing legal education, information, professional services, and expertise through its 38 chapters and over 50 national committees. Its national headquarters are in Washington, D.C.

History 

Originally called the Association of Immigration and Nationality Lawyers, the association was founded on October 14, 1946 by a group of 19 immigration lawyers and professionals in Manhattan, New York. Twelve of the association founders had recently worked for the Immigration and Naturalization Service, and saw an opportunity to utilize their professional standing "to elevate the standard and reputation of the practitioner appearing before the Immigration Service." Josh Koenigsberg served as the first president of the association with Gaspare Cusumano as vice president, Anita Streep as secretary, and Daniel Caputi as treasurer.

In 1982, the association established a national headquarters in Washington, D.C., and it was renamed the American Immigration Lawyers Association.

By 1985, the association had 1,800 members; a three-fold increase from 1975. , there are over 15,000 AILA members spread over 39 chapters in the United States and across the world.

Mission 
AILA's mission, as stated on its website, is to "promote justice, advocate for fair and reasonable immigration law and policy, advance the quality of immigration and nationality law and practice, and enhance the professional development of its members."

Publications 
AILA Publications is the publishing arm of the American Immigration Lawyers Association (AILA) and is the leading publisher of information and analysis serving the practicing immigration lawyer and those in need of immigration law information. AILA Publications is the publisher of many notable titles—among them are Kurzban's Immigration Law Sourcebook, Immigration Consequences of Criminal Activity, AILA's Asylum Primer, Litigating Immigration Cases in Federal Court, Representing Clients in Immigration Court, and Essentials of Immigration Law.

References

External links
 

501(c)(6) nonprofit organizations
American bar associations
Immigration political advocacy groups in the United States
United States immigration law
History of immigration to the United States
Organizations established in 1946
1946 establishments in the United States